Marine Lines (station code: MEL) is a railway station in Marine Lines, South Mumbai on the Western line of the Mumbai Suburban Railway.

The Marine Lines station at one point of time was south of the current day location, near the church of Our Lady of Seven Dolours. At one point of time, trains used to terminate at Marine Lines. Before the Colaba station was closed down in the 1930s, Marine lines used to be the third stop on the railway line.

Almost all the north-bound fast trains stop at Marine Lines. Southbound fast locals stop at Marine Lines, but skip the station during the evening peak hours (17:00 to 20:00).

Near the station there is a Muslim cemetery and a municipal crematorium, Chandanwadi. The stairs of north end of the station pass by the cemetery. The commuters use the cemetery path to reach the station quickly. Also adjoining the station is the famous Marine Drive flyover which is the only link to Marine Drive over the tracks from Princess Street beginning to end. The south end exit climbs up to Princess Street which leads to Kalbadevi Road. It was featured in the film Jaane Bhi Do Yaaro.

References 

Railway stations opened in 1867
Railway stations in Mumbai City district
Mumbai Suburban Railway stations
Mumbai WR railway division